The City of Onkaparinga ATP Challenger is a professional tennis tournament played on outdoor hard courts. It is currently part of the ATP Challenger Tour. It is held annually at the Happy Valley Tennis Club in Happy Valley, South Australia, Australia, since 2015.

Past finals

Singles

Doubles

External links
Official website
ITF Search

 
ATP Challenger Tour
Hard court tennis tournaments
Tennis tournaments in Australia